Merlin Bartz (born March 16, 1961) is an American politician who served as an Iowa State Senator from the 6th District, elected in 2008 and serving for a single term. A Republican, he sat on the Appropriations, Human Resources, Natural Resources, and Ways and Means committees. He was the ranking member on the Administration and Regulation Appropriations Subcommittee.

Bartz lost his reelection bid in 2012 in a race where there were two incumbents redistricted together.  Incumbent Mary Jo Wilhlem defeated Senator Bartz by 126 votes in a very contentious election, where at one point Bartz was accused of joining the War on Women and of being demeaning to women.

Previously he served in the Iowa House of Representatives (19th District, 1991 – 1993), and the Iowa Senate (10th District, 1993 – 2002). He was Senate Assistant Majority Leader in the 77th, 78th, and 79th General Assemblies. Bartz was appointed (January, 2002) Special Assistant to the Undersecretary, Natural Resources and Environment, U.S. Department of Agriculture in Washington, D.C. He is a sixth generation Iowa farmer. From July 2004, he was Regional Assistant Chief, Central, for the Natural Resources Conservation Service (NRCS).  He was a management representative of the Chief, providing direction of NRCS programs and activities and overall leadership and supervision to state conservationists in Arkansas, Illinois, Iowa, Kansas, Louisiana, Minnesota, Missouri, Nebraska, North Dakota, Oklahoma, South Dakota, Texas, and Wisconsin. Bartz has a B.A. music and political science from Luther College.

Issues
Bartz has focused on reining in expenditures. Bartz launched a drive to gather petitions asking County Recorders to deny marriage licenses for same-sex marriages after Democrats thwarted efforts to launch a constitutional amendment in the Iowa General Assembly following the Iowa Supreme Court's 2009 ruling in Varnum v. Brien authorizing same-sex marriage in Iowa.

Electoral history

References

External links
 

1961 births
Living people
Republican Party Iowa state senators
People from Worth County, Iowa
People from Mason City, Iowa
Luther College (Iowa) alumni
Republican Party members of the Iowa House of Representatives
George W. Bush administration personnel
American Lutherans
United States Department of Agriculture officials